The Grande Île is an island that lies at the historic centre of the city of Strasbourg in France. Its name means "Large Island", and derives from the fact that it is surrounded on one side by the main channel of the Ill River and on the other side by the Canal du Faux-Rempart, a canalised arm of that river. Grande Île was named a UNESCO World Heritage Site in 1988. At the time, the International Council on Monuments and Sites noted that Grande Île is "an old quarter that exemplifies medieval cities". Strasbourg was the first city to have its entire city center be listed as a World Heritage Site.

Grande Île is sometimes referred to as "ellipse insulaire" because of its shape. At the centre of the island lies Place Kléber, the city's central square. Further south is Strasbourg Cathedral, the world's fourth-tallest church and an ornate example of 15th-century Gothic architecture. At the western end of the island is the quarter of Petite France, the former home of the city's tanners, millers and fishermen, and now one of Strasbourg's main tourist attractions. The Grande Île also houses the former fluvial customs house Ancienne Douane.

Besides the cathedral, the Grande Île is home to four other centuries-old churches: St. Thomas, St. Pierre-le-Vieux, St. Pierre-le-Jeune, and St. Étienne. Being the historical center of Strasbourg and the seat of local secular power, it also houses the city's most imposing 18th-century hôtels particuliers and palaces, including the Palais Rohan, the Hôtel de Hanau (now the city hall), Hôtel des Deux-Ponts (birthplace of Ludwig I of Bavaria and now home to the city's military governor), Hôtel de Klinglin, Hôtel d'Andlau-Klinglin, Hôtel de Neuwiller, among many others. The island is also home to the Episcopal palace of the Archdiocese of Strasbourg.

To mark Grande Île's status as a World Heritage Site, 22 brass plates were placed on the bridges giving access to the island.

Gallery

References

External links

UNESCO

River islands of France
Geography of Strasbourg
World Heritage Sites in France
Landforms of Bas-Rhin
Tourist attractions in Strasbourg